We Meet Again is a jazz album by Ramsey Lewis and Billy Taylor, released in 1989. Lewis and Taylor duet on songs composed by Taylor, Duke Ellington, Chick Corea, Oscar Peterson, Bill Evans, and Horace Silver, among others.

Critical reception
The Chicago Tribune wrote that "Lewis and Taylor work together elegantly, producing a sound that's big and brassy without being percussive."

Track listing

Personnel
 Ramsey Lewis – piano
 Billy Taylor – piano

References

1989 albums
Columbia Records albums
Ramsey Lewis albums